Darnley may refer to:

People
 Henry Stuart, Lord Darnley, consort of Mary, Queen of Scots
 Earl of Darnley, peerage title

Places
 Darnley, part of Glasgow, Scotland
 Darnley Island (Queensland), Queensland, Australia
 Two places in Antarctica
 Cape Darnley (Mac. Robertson Land)
 Cape Darnley (South Georgia)
 Two places in Canada
 Darnley, Prince Edward Island
 Darnley Bay, Northwest Territories

Fiction
 Darnley, a fictional city in Philip George Chadwick's The Death Guard
 Darnley Mills, a fictional town in books by Philip Turner
 Darnley, or, The Field of the Cloth of Gold, an 1830 novel by George Payne Rainsford James

See also
 Darnley Lime Works Tramway and Mineral Railway
 Dams to Darnley Country Park